Nova 919 (call sign: 5ADL) is a commercial radio station operating in Adelaide, Australia, owned by NOVA Entertainment.

Along with its sister stations Nova 100 Melbourne, Nova 96.9 Sydney, Nova 106.9 Brisbane and Nova 93.7 Perth, Nova now claims to be Australia's leading brand in the women demographic of ages between 45-54.

News Readers 
 Taylee Jones (Breakfast & Midday)
 Michelle Stephenson (National News Manager & Drive)

References

External links 
 Nova 91.9 Website
 NOVA Entertainment
 Nova 919.9 Shows

Nova Entertainment
Radio stations in Adelaide
Contemporary hit radio stations in Australia